Jan Cornelis Terlouw (born 15 November 1931) is a retired Dutch politician, physicist and author. A member of the Democrats 66 (D66) party, he served as Deputy Prime Minister of the Netherlands from 1981 to 1982 under Prime Minister Dries van Agt.

Terlouw studied Physics and Mathematics at the Utrecht University simultaneously obtaining Master of Physics and Mathematics degree and worked as a researcher at the FOM before finishing his thesis and graduated as a Doctor of Science in Nuclear physics. Terlouw worked as a nuclear physics researcher at the Massachusetts Institute of Technology (MIT) from February 1960 until April 1962 and for the Royal Institute of Technology (KTH) from August 1965 until December 1966. After the election of 1971 Terlouw was elected as a Member of the House of Representatives on 11 May 1971 and served as a frontbencher and spokesperson for Economic Affairs and Science. After Party Leader and Parliamentary leader Hans van Mierlo announced he was stepping down Terlouw was unanimously selected as his successor on 1 September 1973.

For the elections of 1977 and 1981 Terlouw served as Lijsttrekker (top candidate) and following a cabinet formation with Christian-democratic Leader Dries van Agt and Labour Leader Joop den Uyl formed the Cabinet Van Agt II with Terlouw appointed as Deputy Prime Minister and Minister of Economic Affairs taking office on 11 September 1981. The cabinet fell just seven months into its term and was replaced with the caretaker Cabinet Van Agt III with Terlouw continuing his offices. For the election of 1982 Terlouw again served as Lijsttrekker but shortly thereafter announced he was stepping down as Leader on 8 September 1982.

Terlouw continued to be active in politics and in December 1982 he was nominated as the next Secretary-General of the International Transport Forum (ITF) serving from 30 January 1983 until 15 October 1991.  In October 1991 Terlouw was nominated as the next Queen's Commissioner of Gelderland serving from 1 November 1991 until 1 December 1996. Terlouw also became active in the public sector, and worked as a professor of Urbanization at the University of Amsterdam from January 1997 until January 2000. After the Senate election of 1999 Terlouw was elected as a Member of the Senate serving from 8 June 1999 until 10 June 2003 and served as a frontbencher and spokesperson for the Interior, Economic Affairs and Defence.

Terlouw retired from active politics at 71 but continued to be active in the public sector as a non-profit director and served on several state commissions (nl) and councils on behalf of the government, and worked as a professor of Literature at the Tilburg University from September 2003 until September 2004. Following his retirement Terlouw continues to be active as an advocate and activist for Social norms, Sustainable development, Animal welfare and for more European integration.

Terlouw has been active as a prolific author since the 1970's having written more than dozen young adult fiction books, his 1972 novel Winter in Wartime was adapted and released as a feature film in 2008.

Background

Early life and education
Terlouw was born in Kamperveen, Overijssel and grew up in the Veluwe. He was the eldest son a family of five, having two younger brothers and two sisters.

After high school, Terlouw studied at Utrecht University, where he obtained an MSc degree in mathematics and physics, and a PhD degree in nuclear physics.

Career
After graduating from Utrecht University, he worked as a physics researcher in the Netherlands, the United States, and Sweden.

After working for thirteen years, he became a politician, joining the Dutch House of Representatives (the lower house of the Dutch legislature) as a member of the Democraten 66 political party in 1970

Personal life
Terlouw was married to Alexandra van Hulst until her death on 23 August 2017. Terlouw is a father of four and grandfather of twelve.

Publications
Terlouw wrote 24 children's books, most notably Winter in Wartime (Oorlogswinter, 1972) and How to Become King (Koning van Katoren, 1971), both of which won the Gouden Griffel and have been made into motion pictures directed by Martin Koolhoven.

Terlouw's books have been illustrated by various illustrators, including Dick van der Maat, Martijn van der Linden and Fiel van der Veen.

Awards
1972 Gouden Griffel for the novel How to Become King
1973 Gouden Griffel for the novel Winter in Wartime
1990 Prize of the Netherlands Children's Jury for the novel The Figure-skater
2000 Prize of the Dutch Joung Jury for Eigen rechter (1988)

Decorations

References

External links

Official
  Dr. J.C. (Jan) Terlouw Parlement & Politiek
  Dr. J.C. Terlouw (D66) Eerste Kamer der Staten-Generaal

 
 

 

1931 births
Living people
Commanders of the Order of Orange-Nassau
Democrats 66 politicians
Deputy Prime Ministers of the Netherlands
Dutch agnostics
Dutch astrophysicists
Dutch children's writers
Dutch expatriates in France
Dutch expatriates in Sweden
Dutch expatriates in the United States
Dutch male screenwriters
Dutch nonprofit directors
Dutch nonprofit executives
Dutch nuclear physicists
Dutch political commentators
Gouden Griffel winners
King's and Queen's Commissioners of Gelderland
Leaders of the Democrats 66
Massachusetts Institute of Technology faculty
Members of the House of Representatives (Netherlands)
Members of the Royal Netherlands Academy of Arts and Sciences
Members of the Senate (Netherlands)
Ministers of Economic Affairs of the Netherlands
Municipal councillors of Utrecht (city)
OECD officials
Particle physicists
People from Kampen, Overijssel
People from Voorst
Radiation health effects researchers
Academic staff of the KTH Royal Institute of Technology
Royal Netherlands Army personnel
Academic staff of Tilburg University
Academic staff of the University of Amsterdam
Utrecht University alumni
Academic staff of Utrecht University
20th-century Dutch educators
20th-century Dutch male writers
20th-century Dutch mathematicians
20th-century Dutch military personnel
20th-century Dutch politicians
20th-century Dutch scientists
21st-century Dutch educators
21st-century Dutch male writers
21st-century Dutch mathematicians
21st-century Dutch politicians
21st-century Dutch scientists